

The LVG D.III was a German fighter plane built by LVG in World War I.

Design
The D.III was similar to the LVG D.II in that it was a single-seat biplane fighter with wings of unequal span and a plywood covered semi-monocoque fuselage. N struts between the wings and two sets of 'V' struts held the center section of the upper wing above the fuselage. The lower wing had rounded tips, while upper wings had straight tips with a slight angle.

Development
Test flights began in May 1917 and were completed by 2 June 1917. However, the Idflieg decided that the D.III was too large and too heavy, so the D.III remained a prototype.

Specifications

References

Bibliography

1910s German fighter aircraft
D 03
Rotary-engined aircraft
Biplanes
Aircraft first flown in 1917